Tarumi Station is the name of two train stations in Japan:

 Tarumi Station (Gifu) (樽見駅)
 Tarumi Station (Hyogo) (垂水駅)